Nowy Widzim  is a village in the administrative district of Gmina Wolsztyn, within Wolsztyn County, Greater Poland Voivodeship, in west-central Poland.

The village has a population of 322.

References

Nowy Widzim